Since its independence in 1961, Kuwait maintained strong international relations with most countries, especially nations within the Arab world. Its vast oil reserves gives it a prominent voice in global economic forums and organizations like the OPEC. Kuwait is also a major ally of ASEAN, a regional ally of China, and a major non-NATO ally.

Overview

Regionally, Kuwait has a unique foreign policy that is characterized by neutrality. Kuwait's relationship with neighboring Iraq formed the core of its foreign policy from late 1980s onwards. Its first major foreign policy problem arose when Iraq claimed Kuwaiti territory. Iraq threatened invasion, but was dissuaded by the United Kingdom's ready response to the Amir's request for assistance. Kuwait presented its case before the United Nations and successfully preserved its sovereignty. UK forces were later withdrawn and replaced by troops from Arab League nations, which were withdrawn in 1963 at Kuwait's request.

On 2 August 1990, Iraq invaded and occupied Kuwait. A multinational coalition was assembled and under UN auspices, initiated military action against Iraq to liberate Kuwait. Arab states, especially the other five members of the Gulf Cooperation Council (Saudi Arabia, Bahrain, Qatar, Oman, and the United Arab Emirates), Egypt, and Syria, supported Kuwait by sending troops to fight with the coalition. Many European and East Asian states sent troops, equipment, and/or financial support.

After its liberation, Kuwait largely directed its diplomatic and cooperative efforts toward states that had participated in the multinational coalition. Notably, many of these states were given key roles in the reconstruction of Kuwait. Conversely, Kuwait's relations with nations that had supported Iraq, among them Jordan, Sudan, Yemen, Greece and Cuba, have proved to be strained.

Since the conclusion of the Gulf War, Kuwait has made efforts to secure allies throughout the world, particularly United Nations Security Council members. In addition to the United States, defense arrangements have been concluded with Russia, the United Kingdom, and France. Close ties to other key Arab members of the Gulf War coalition — Egypt and Syria — also have been sustained.

Kuwait's foreign policy has been dominated for some time by its economic dependence on oil and natural gas. As a developing nation, its various economies are insufficient to independently support it. As a result, Kuwait has directed considerable attention toward oil or natural gas related issues. With the outbreak of the War on Iraq, Kuwait has taken a pro-U.S. stance, having been the nation from which the war was actually launched. It supported the Coalition Provisional Authority, with particular stress upon strict border controls and adequate U.S. troop presence. Kuwait also has good relations with Iran.

Kuwait is a member of the UN and some of its specialized and related agencies, including the World Bank (IBRD), International Monetary Fund (IMF), World Trade Organization (WTO), General Agreement on Tariffs and Trade (GATT); African Development Bank (AFDB), Arab Fund for Economic and Social Development (AFESD), Arab League, Arab Monetary Fund (AMF), Council of Arab Economic Unity (CAEU), Economic and Social Commission for Western Asia (ESCWA), Group of 77 (G-77), Gulf Cooperation Council (GCC), INMARSAT, International Development Association (IDA), International Finance Corporation, International Fund for Agricultural Development, International Labour Organization (ILO), International Marine Organization, Interpol, IOC, Islamic Development Bank (IDB), League of Red Cross and Red Crescent Societies (LORCS), Non-Aligned Movement, Organization of Arab Petroleum Exporting Countries (OAPEC), Organisation of Islamic Cooperation (OIC), Organization of Petroleum Exporting Countries (OPEC), and the International Atomic Energy Agency (IAEA).

International disputes
In November 1994, Iraq formally accepted the UN-demarcated border with Kuwait which had been spelled out in Security Council Resolutions 687 (1991), 773 (1992), and 883 (1993); this formally ends earlier claims to Kuwait and to Bubiyan and Warbah Island islands; ownership of Qaruh and Umm al Maradim islands disputed by Saudi Arabia. Kuwait and Saudi Arabia continue negotiating a joint maritime boundary with Iran; no maritime boundary exists with Iraq in the Persian Gulf.

Bilateral relations

Africa

Americas

Asia 
Kuwait, is a member of the Cooperation Council for the Arab States of the Gulf, which includes, Saudi Arabia, Bahrain, Qatar, the United Arab Emirates, and Oman. These countries, have solid, and unbreakable bilateral relations. Citizens of these countries, may enter other GCC, country with their national ID. GCC citizens are allowed to reside at any other GCC, nation an unlimited period of time. They also follow the same economic plan, and give each other military, and Intelligence support. They also have similar, educational, social, plans. The GCC countries, discuss their foreign policies, as they try to maintain similar foreign policies. These six monarchies are also known as the oil-rich countries of the Middle East.

Europe

Oceania

See also
 List of diplomatic missions in Kuwait
 List of diplomatic missions of Kuwait
 Iran-Arab Relations (Kuwait)
 Visa requirements for Kuwaiti citizens

References